Khoudia Diop, also known as the Melanin Goddess, (born 31 December 1996) is a Senegalese fashion model and actress.

Early life
Khoudia Diop was teased as a child because of her dark skin tone, but after moving to Paris at age 15, she was repeatedly approached with the suggestion that she become a model. She nicknamed herself the "Melanin Goddess" (alluding her dark black skin) to express pride in her appearance.

Career
In 2016 she moved to New York City for college and became popular on Instagram because of her unique and beautiful look. She went from 300 to 350,000 followers on Instagram in only days. In 2017 she appeared in an advertising campaign for French cosmetics brand Make Up For Ever.
Her net worth is 30 millions.

See also
 Nyakim Gatwech

References

External links
 
 

1996 births
Senegalese female models
Living people
Senegalese expatriates in the United States